Watermusic is a soundtrack album recorded by Danish singer and songwriter Oh Land. It was self-released by Oh Land on 30 March 2018. The music is taken from a live opera that was broadcast in Denmark. 
It includes a Danish version of the singer's 2013 song "Love You Better", taken from Wish Bone and retitled "Elsker Dig Mer".

Track listing

References 

2018 live albums
Oh Land albums
Self-released albums